St. Francis High School is a private, Roman Catholic high school in Humphrey, Nebraska, United States.  It is located in the Roman Catholic Archdiocese of Omaha.

Athletics
St. Francis is a member of the Nebraska School Activities Association.  They have won the following NSAA State Championships:

 Boys' football - 1995, 1996, 2009,  2015, 2019
 Girls' volleyball - 2000, 2004, 2005
 Boys' basketball - 1941, 1943, 1990, 1992, 1994, 2006, 2016
 Girls' basketball - 2005, 2006, 2007
 Boys' baseball - 1954, 1955
 Boys' golf - 1998, 1999
 Girls' track and field - 2006

References

External links
 School website

Catholic secondary schools in Nebraska
Schools in Platte County, Nebraska
Roman Catholic Archdiocese of Omaha